ETSWAP (Emissions Trading Scheme Workflow Automation Project) is the web-based system operated by the UK Environment Agency for emitters to manage, verify and report their emissions of Carbon Dioxide (and in the future, other Greenhouse Gases), as required by the EU ETS (European Union Emissions Trading Scheme).
 
The structure and process of the ETSWAP system was outlined in a Mutual Understanding Document produced by the governments of the UK, Germany, Ireland and The Netherlands, which also dubbed the system "Workflow Automation Project" (WAP).
The application is designed to meet the new requirements of the EU ETS resulting from the  2008/101/CE Directive.

The system is designed to facilitate completion and submission of verified emissions and benchmarking reports, viewing of approved emissions/benchmarking plans for existing operators and submission of emissions plans for new operators.
As at July 2011, ETSWAP is configured for reporting of carbon emissions by the aviation sector and has been used by 600 aviation operators in the UK and 200 in the Republic of Ireland. The system is being expanded to cover emissions by fixed installations by 2012.

References 

<https://ets.epa.ie/Common/Help.aspx#gen20 />
<http://ec.europa.eu/clima/events/0008/s2_o_joel_uk_ea.pdf />
<https://web.archive.org/web/20111007100206/http://www.ebace.aero/2011/archives/presentations/20110518-wiese-eu-ets-operators-responsibility-liabilities.pdf />

External links 
 UK Environment Agency
 Education for Sustainable Development Forum
 pdf: UK Use of IT tools in the EU ETS Compliance Process
 CDC Climat Brochure
 Edie Ireland News Article: Irish and British aviation emissions cutting work underway
 pdf: Department for Transport Presentation at the BBGA Annual Conference, 8 March 2011
 Argus Media
 Climate Connect: New emission tracking system for EU ETS Aviation
 Wikipedia: Carbon Monitoring
 TechnoWorldInc- The Technical Encyclopedia
 Rinnovabili.it (Italian)

Emissions trading
Carbon emissions in the European Union
Energy policies and initiatives of the European Union